Kirsten Espensen (died 29 October, 2021), known by her pen name Kit Berry, was an English author. She was known as the author of the Stonewylde series, a fantasy series set in the fictional community of Stonewylde, which attracted an online cult following.

Biography
Espensen lived in Weymouth in Dorset for many years, where she studied for her first degree in English and Media Studies at the then Dorset Institute of Higher Education. She then trained to be a teacher, and taught at local schools.
Jjjj
She became a full-time author and initially published the Stonewylde series under her own self-created publishing label Moongazy Publishing, before signing with Orion Publishing, citing online social networking as one of the reasons behind the series' success.

Bibliography
Magus of Stonewylde
Moondance of Stonewylde
Solstice at Stonewylde
Shadows at Stonewylde
Shaman of Stonewylde

References

External links
 The official Stonewylde site

 Magus of Stonewylde review by BookGeeks

20th-century births
2021 deaths
English fantasy writers
English women writers
Alumni of Weymouth College
Women science fiction and fantasy writers